Memduh Tağmaç (1904, Erzurum - 30 March 1978) was a Turkish general. He was the Chief of the General Staff of Turkey during the 1971 Turkish coup d'état, and previously Commander of the Turkish Army (1968 - 1969) and Commander of the First Army of Turkey (1966 - 1968).

References

External links
Chiefs of General Staff, Turkish General Staff.

1904 births
1978 deaths
Turkish Army generals
Commanders of the Turkish Land Forces
Chiefs of the Turkish General Staff
People from Erzurum